Balqoli or Bolaqli, also rendered as Bolaghi, may refer to:
 Balqoli-ye Kohneh